A carousel slide projector is a slide projector that uses a rotary tray to store slides, used to project slide photographs and to create slideshows. It was first patented on May 11, 1965, by David E. Hansen of Fairport, New York. Hansen was an industrial designer at the Eastman Kodak Company. A patent for the rotary tray was granted in 1966 after a 1962 application by the Eastman Kodak Company.

The original concept for the carousel slide projector is credited to Italian-American Louis Misuraca, who brought his design to the Kodak company, and sold it for a lump sum. Kodak released their first Carousel projector, the Model 550, in 1961 and sold it until 1966. The 1963 Carousel Model S (Carousel-S), a professional model sold only in Germany, was designed by Hans Gugelot and Reinhold Häcker for Kodak AG in Stuttgart and is in the permanent collection of the Museum of Modern Art.

Physical form
A separate, circular tray holds several (usually 80 or 140) 35mm slides, and is filled with each slide placed in upside down and backwards, so that the image is projected with the correct orientation.

The projector body contains a motor which rotates the plastic main body of the tray (containing the slides) while the metal plate is fixed with the opening over the projection gate. As the tray is advanced, a reciprocating mechanism pushes the currently loaded slide back out into the tray, then the tray is rotated, dropping the next slide into position between the light source and lens.

A common series of carousel projectors with a horizontally mounted tray was introduced in the spring of 1962 by Kodak (Kodak Carousel/Ektagraphic). The earliest Carousel models (mostly known as the 500-series) are compatible only with the 80-slide trays.

The Kodak system offered three advantages over the straight-tray, horizontal-feed systems that were then common on the market.  The Carousel tray held slides in place with a locking ring on its hub, preventing slides from accidentally spilling out of the tray if it was dropped. By using gravity to lower the slide into the projector, the chance of jamming was greatly reduced, since a warped slide would not descend past the point at which it encountered resistance in the mechanism.  The circular tray also enabled the projector to display automated shows without the need to manually reset the slide tray between performances.

Kodak also offered a stack loader that allowed running a stack of up to 40 slides without using a tray, but forward only; and clip sets holding up to 36 slides per clip. A box of 12 clips could store up to 432 slides, and keep them organized.

During the 1970s, Kodak also produced a Pocket Carousel projector for use with miniature 110 format Kodachrome and Ektachrome slides.

The Kodak Carousel projector was discontinued in October 2004.

Vertical carousel variants

Less well-known but plentiful is a family of projectors based around a design originated by Sawyer's and later sold under other brand names.  That manufacturer's first slide projectors, in the late 1950s, had used straight trays. In 1963, Sawyer's Rotomatic, the first version using circular trays (called Rototrays), was introduced.  These are distinguished from Kodak Carousel projectors by the round tray being in an upright orientation, like a Ferris wheel. Unlike the Carousel tray's use of a locking collar to hold the slide in the tray, the Rototray held slides in place using friction  and a metal spring against the side of each slide. 

Projectors using the 100-slide Rototray were backward-compatible with the Bell & Howell TDC-Universal straight slide trays that had been popular since the late 1950s. The 1960s would also see the introduction of a plethora of less popular tray designs, most incompatible with each other, introduced by manufacturers possibly hoping to profit from the razor-and-blades business model.

Nomenclature and history
The first Kodak Carousel projector was targeted toward the consumer and carried the model designation '550'. In 1963, the first professionally oriented model was marketed in Germany as the Model S. Other models include:
 1964–72: Carousel 800 (consumer)
 1967–69: Ektagraphic (professional)
 1969–71: Ektagraphic AF, E, and B (professional)
 1971–84: Ektagraphic E-2, B2, F-2, AF-3 (professional)
 1972–81: Carousel 'H' (models 600H, 650H, 750H, 760H, 850H, consumer)
 1975–84: Ektagraphic AF-2K, AF-1
 1979–84: Ektagraphic B-2AR, S-AV 1020, 1030, 2000, 2030, 2050
 1981–2004: Carousel 4000, 4200, 4400, 4600, 5200, 5400, 5600
 1981–2004: Ektagraphic III (E plus, A, AMT, ATS, Br, ABR)
 1992–2004: Ektapro (320, 3000, 9020)
 1992–2004: Ektalite (1000, 1500, 2000)

The manufacturing date may be decoded using the CAMEROSITY code, which is a four or six-letter code which corresponds to the month and year (four-letter) or month, day, and year (six-letter) of manufacture, using the substitution cipher C=1, A=2, M=3, E=4, R=5, O=6, S=7, I=8, T=9, Y=0. The code is located either on a silver label inside the cord storage compartment or pressed into the plastic of the bottom-mounted cord wrap.

In popular culture
The Kodak Carousel slide projector was part of the plot of the 2007 episode "The Wheel" in season 1 of the TV series Mad Men. In the episode, the advertising agency comes up with the name "Carousel", in place of the Kodak executives' name for it, "The Wheel", pitching the device as a nostalgic conveyance that let its viewers travel through their memories as a child would, "around and around and back home again to a place where we know we are loved".

References

External links
 Kodak: Slide projectors family
Kodak Slide Projector on Porter Electronics (Website where they are still available)
 
 

Slide projectors
Kodak